The Triglav Lakes Lodge  (1685 m) is a mountain lodge between Double Lake and the artificial Lake Močivec below Mount Tičarica in the heart of the Julian Alps, northwestern Slovenia. The first structure was built in 1880 by an Austrian hiking club. In 1955 and 1988, it was rebuilt and expanded. It has four dining rooms with 150 seats, 13 rooms with 30 beds, and 13 larger sleeping rooms with 170 bunks. The lodge is open from the end of June until the start of October

Starting points 
 3 h from the Savica Lodge via Komarča
 6 h From the village of Stara Fužina via Vogar and the Dedno Polje Alp
 5½ h Soča via the Velika Vrata

Neighbouring mountains 
 1 h  Mala Tičarica (2071 m) 1 h
 2½ h Big Mount Špičje (2398 m)
 3½ h  Zelnarica (2320 m) 3–4 h

See also 
 Slovenian Mountain Hiking Trail

References
 Slovenska planinska pot, Planinski vodnik, PZS, 2012, Milenko Arnejšek - Prle, Andraž Poljanec

External links 
 Triglav Lakes Lodge on Hribi.net Routes and Photos (slo)
 Triglav Lakes Lodge on Via-Alpina

Triglav National Park
Mountain huts in Slovenia